The Lamborghini Athon is a concept car designed by Bertone for Lamborghini.

Performance capabilities and features 
The Lamborghini Athon is capable of being driven and is a fully functional production concept car. The transmission contains an all synchromesh gearbox that consists of a five speed with a single plate hydraulically assisted clutch and an axle ratio of 14/35. The Bertone company SpA design includes an integral chassis and steel body. The suspension has independent wry coil springs and telescopic shock absorbers. The Campagnolo cast magnesium pneumatically actuated brakes consist of  Girling ventilated discs. The front tyres are Michelin 195/50 VR 15 and 275/40 VR 15 at the rear. The Lamborghini Athon weighs 2,390 lbs and has an 80 litre fuel tank. In terms of performance, the Lamborghini Athon is able to reach a top speed of 170 mph (273.6 km/h) and can go from 0 to 60 mph (97 km/h) in 7.3 seconds. The RM Sotheby's company auctioned the Lamborghini Athon in Concorso d'Eleganza Villa d'Este on May 21, 2011. It sold for $487,000 United States Dollars and its present-day estimated price value, according to RM Auctions, is between $213,000 to $312,000 United States Dollars.

The Lamborghini Athon as a concept car 
The Bertone company, a private company based in Italy, created the Lamborghini Athon to show their everlasting support for the Lamborghini company according to the Turin coachbuilder press release. The Lamborghini Athon was given its name because the car is a spider and made for fair-weather; the name makes reference to the Egyptian cult of the sun.

Design aspects 

Marc Deschamps, a Frenchman, lead the design process for the Lamborghini Athon which was Bertone Studio's first ever concept car. He was chosen to lead the design after Marcello Gandini left the position as the design coordinator in 1979 for Bertone. The car was based on the silhouette sport type aesthetic and resembled some of the looks of the Lamborghini Urraco. Marc Deschamps honored the prior design of Bertone's concept cars; he specifically made the Lamborghini Athon much like the concept cars Bertone created in the 1970s. He included "sculpted geometric volumes" that were defined by clear edges and cut lines. Marc Deschamps also did not follow what is universally known as the traditional spider design for the car. The Lamborghini Athon, a proclaimed spider, has its cabin located in a forward position as opposed to the traditional mid-set cabin in a normal spider. Another detail that sets the Athon apart from the original aesthetics of a spider is the height and position of the rear deck compared to the height and positioning of the sloping hood. This design concept would later be used when the Bertone company created the Jalpa Speedster. The design of the Lamborghini Athon also influenced media and movie productions. The Athon was referenced when making the props for the following films: Tron, Total Recall, and RoboCop.

Signature Marc Deschamp Athon design 
Marc Deschamp was also inspired by Nuccio Bertone added a few more unique features the cars body. For example, Marc Deschamps created the doors so they would have a noticeable gap between the doors and the door sills. Another thing to note is that Marc Deschamps also designed the tail lights to have very thin grooves in order to assure that they did not interfere with the solid rear end of the car. Something unique to note about the car is the design of the steering wheel and touch screen panels. The steering wheel was designed with a single spoke. Note that to the left of the steering wheel, there was a pod. The mounted pod was used as a place to hold the secondary controls. The touch screen panels were equipped with electronic readouts. Vegalie, an Italian supplier, created the instrumental design of the Lamborghini Athon. They made the windshield wipers, turn signals, as well as the indicator switches which are in close reach within the steering wheel. The Lamborghini Athon's design was created in honor of Fillipo Perini in honor of his devout love to the Lamborghini Silhouette aesthetic appearance. His impact as a designer for Lamborghini is seen in the Lamborghini Athon's front sloping hood. The Lamborghini Athon was forcefully given to the Bertone company as the Lamborghini company was in the process of liquidation and going through financial difficulty. The Lamborghini Athon was retired in the Bertone museum located in Rubiana, Italy directly after it showcased in the Turin Auto Show. Bertone occasionally removed the car from its museum and made it displayed for the public at a few select shows. Although it has had minor repairs to some of the mechanical components of the car, the Lamborghini Athon was never restored. Because of it having never been restored, the Lamborghini Athon is offered in its original condition.

Impact on Lamborghini as a company 
The Athon was created during Lamborghini's financial crisis, which threatened to end with the company's liquidation. As a result, the Athon's greatest impact on the company would have to be when Bertone put it in their museum. The press associated with this move brought more attention to the Athon and Lamborghini as a company.

References

Athon
Bertone concept vehicles